Francavilla Bisio is a comune (municipality) in the Province of Alessandria in the Italian region Piedmont, located about  southeast of Turin and about  southeast of Alessandria.

Francavilla Bisio borders the following municipalities: Basaluzzo, Capriata d'Orba, Gavi, Pasturana, San Cristoforo, and Tassarolo.

References

Cities and towns in Piedmont